Fox 2 may refer to:


Television stations in the United States

Affiliated with the Fox Broadcasting Company

Owned-and-operated
KTVU, Oakland–San Francisco, California
WJBK, Detroit, Michigan

Current affiliates
KATN-DT2, Fairbanks, Alaska
KGAN-DT2, Cedar Rapids, Iowa
KHON-TV, Honolulu, Hawaii
KTVI, St. Louis, Missouri

Formerly affiliated
KASA-TV, Albuquerque–Santa Fe, New Mexico (1993–2017)
XHRIO in McAllen, Texas (licensed to Matamoros, Tamaulipas, Mexico; 2005–2012)

Affiliated with Fox
 Fox Sports 2

Other uses
 Fox (code word) Two, a brevity code for an infrared homing air-to-air missile launch
 RBM9 (RNA binding motif protein 9), also called FOX-2